Douglas David "Duggan" Anderson (21 September 1924 – 7 December 2012) was an Australian rules footballer who played for the Swan Districts Football Club in the Western Australian National Football League (WANFL), and later served in a variety of administrative roles at the club. He suffered a terrible accident on his family's farm in January 1947 and lost all the fingers on his left hand. Anderson not only recovered to play football again but also played the first game of the 1947 season.
Duggan was a noted defender and mostly played a centre half back where he was a solid contributor.
In the Swan Districts Team of the Century Anderson is listed on the interchange bench.
After retiring as a player Anderson remained involved in the club serving as a club committee member and club president.

He was inducted into the West Australian Football Hall of Fame in 2011.

References

External links
Duggan Anderson player profile page at WAFL FootyFacts

1924 births
2012 deaths
Australian rules footballers from Western Australia
Swan Districts Football Club administrators
Swan Districts Football Club players
West Australian Football Hall of Fame inductees
People from the South West (Western Australia)